Portneuf is a municipality in the Portneuf Regional County Municipality, in the province of Quebec, Canada. It is located on the Saint Lawrence River, between Quebec City and Trois-Rivières. The Portneuf River runs on the east side of the town centre.

The town of Portneuf is named after a seignory that was founded in 1636, and first settled in 1640.

The municipal territory consists of 2 non-contiguous areas, separated by the municipality of Sainte-Christine-d'Auvergne. The smaller northern portion is undeveloped, whereas the southern piece is the main inhabited part with the population centres of Portneuf (south of Autoroute 40), and the adjacent Notre-Dame-de-Portneuf, north of A-40. The present-day municipality was created in 2002, when the old city of Portneuf merged with the town of Notre-Dame-de-Portneuf.

The town is located on the Chemin du Roy, a historic segment of Quebec Route 138 that stretches from near Montreal to Quebec City. The town is also close by to A-40, where Provencher Street connects to the town at Exit 261.

One of Portneuf's major employers is a local paper mill owned by Metro Paper Industries, a Toronto-based paper company. Paper had been a major part of Portneuf's development since the first paper mill opened in 1839.

History
In 1636, the area was granted by the Compagnie de la Nouvelle-France as a seignory to Jacques Leneuf de La Poterie (1606-after 1685), who arrived in Quebec only some months later and became substitute governor of Trois-Rivières from 1645 to 1662. The first colonizers came around 1640 and settled at the mouth of the "Port Neuf" River (meaning new harbour).

In 1817, the Portneuf post office opened. In 1861, the Parish of Notre-Dame-de-Portneuf was formed, and two years later in 1863, it was incorporated as a parish municipality. In 1896, it lost a large portion of its territory when the Parish Municipality of Sainte-Christine was formed.

In 1914, the village centre itself separated from the Parish Municipality of Notre-Dame-de-Portneuf and was incorporated as the Village Municipality of Notre-Dame-de-Portneuf. In 1961, this latter one changed status and abbreviated its name, becoming the City of Portneuf. On July 4, 2002, the parish municipality was amalgamated into the new City of Portneuf.

Demographics 

Population trend:
 Population in 2011: 3107 (2006 to 2011 population change: 0.7%)
 Population in 2006: 3086
 Population total in 2001: 3095
 Notre-Dame-de-Portneuf (parish): 1659
 Portneuf (ville): 1436
 Population in 1996:
 Notre-Dame-de-Portneuf (parish): 1727
 Portneuf (ville): 1470
 Population in 1991:
 Notre-Dame-de-Portneuf (parish): 1675
 Portneuf (ville): 1394

Mother tongue:
 English as first language: 0.8%
 French as first language: 97.2%
 English and French as first language: 0.3%
 Other as first language: 1.6%

Image gallery

See also
 Portneuf Regional Natural Park

References

External links 

 Municipality of Portneuf 
 Portneuf RCM: Info about Portneuf 
photo-portneuf.com: Photos of Portneuf and nearby communities 

Cities and towns in Quebec
Incorporated places in Capitale-Nationale